Christl Filippovits (born 12 July 1944) is an Austrian former breaststroke swimmer. She competed at the 1960, 1964 and the 1968 Summer Olympics.

References

External links
 

1944 births
Living people
Austrian female breaststroke swimmers
Olympic swimmers of Austria
Swimmers at the 1960 Summer Olympics
Swimmers at the 1964 Summer Olympics
Swimmers at the 1968 Summer Olympics
Sportspeople from Upper Austria
People from Schärding District